Pholidobolus vertebralis, the brown pholiodobolus, is a species of lizard in the family Gymnophthalmidae. It is found in Panama, Ecuador, Colombia, and Peru.

References

Pholidobolus
Reptiles described in 1879
Taxa named by Arthur William Edgar O'Shaughnessy